Misericordia is the Latin for "mercy", derived from misericors, "merciful", which is in turn derived from misereri, "to pity", and cor, "heart", and may refer to:

Places and organisations
 Misericórdia, a parish in the municipality of Lisbon, Portugal
 Misericórdia Church, Sé, Braga, Portugal
 Misericordia Community Hospital, Edmonton, Canada
 Misericordia Health Centre, Winnipeg, Canada
 Misericordia Home, Chicago, Illinois
 Misericordia Hospital (Grosseto), Grosseto, Italy
 Misericordia Hospital, The Bronx, USA
 Misericordia University, Dallas, Pennsylvania, USA
 Mater Misericordiae University Hospital, Dublin, Ireland
 Archconfraternity of the Misericordia, a Roman Catholic religious congregation
 Castelnuovo della Misericordia
 Abbazia della Misericordia, a religious edifice in Venice, Italy
 Sant'Anna la Misericordia, a Baroque church of Palermo
 Museu da Misericórdia do Porto, Portugal

Documents
 Dives in misericordia, a papal document of Pope John Paul II
 Misericordiae vultus, another papal document of Pope Francis
 Misericordia Dei, the title of an apostolic letter by Pope John Paul II
 Misericordia et Misera, an ecclesiastical letter authored by Pope Francis

Other uses 
 Banner of Misericordia, a work of the Catalan architect Antoni Gaudí
 Misericordia Sunday, a Sunday in Eastertide in the Christian liturgical calendar
 Ríos de Misericordia, a Mexican Christian musical group
 A blade used by the Custodes: the personal guard of the emperor in the fictional Warhammer 40000 universe.

See also
 
 Misericord, church ornament
 Misericorde (weapon), a type of dagger